"Tum Mere Ho" may refer to:

 Tum Mere Ho, 1990 film by Tahir Hussain
 Tum Mere Ho (Jubin Nautiyal song), a song from film Hate Story 4